Euryphura chalcis, the common commander, is a butterfly in the family Nymphalidae. It is found in Senegal, Guinea, Sierra Leone, Liberia, Ivory Coast, Ghana, Togo, Benin, Nigeria, Cameroon, Gabon, the Republic of the Congo, the Central African Republic, the Democratic Republic of the Congo, Uganda, Kenya, Tanzania and Zambia. The habitat consists of forests.

Adults have been recorded feeding on Cleistopholis patens. It is thought the nectar in these flowers had fermented.

The larvae feed on Hugonia platysepala, Ventilago, Pterocarpus, Dalbergia, Cassia, Celtis, Hippocratea and Chrysophyllum species.

Subspecies
Euryphura chalcis chalcis (Senegal, Guinea, Sierra Leone, Liberia, Ivory Coast, Ghana, Togo, Benin, Nigeria, Cameroon, Gabon, Congo, Central African Republic, Democratic Republic of the Congo, western Uganda, north-western Tanzania, north-western Zambia)
Euryphura chalcis kiellandi Hecq, 1990 (western Tanzania)

References

Butterflies described in 1860
Limenitidinae
Butterflies of Africa
Taxa named by Baron Cajetan von Felder
Taxa named by Rudolf Felder